Émile Georget (21 September 1881 – 16 October 1960) was a French road racing cyclist. Born in Bossay-sur-Claise, he was the younger brother of cyclist Léon Georget. He died at Châtellerault.

Career achievements

Tour de France 
Georget started nine times in the Tour de France:
1905 : 4th place in the general classification.
1906 : 5th place in the general classification, winner of one stage.
1907 : 3rd place in the general classification, winner of six stages.
1908 : Withdrew in 2nd stage.
1910 : Withdrew in 12th stage, winner of one stage.
1911 : 3rd place in the general classification, winner of one stage.
1912 : Withdrew in 3rd stage.
1913 : Did not start in 4th stage.
1914 : 6th in the general classification.

Victories 
Other than in the Tour de France, Georget won eight races:
1906 : 24 hours of Brussels: (with his brother Léon Georget)
1907 : Paris-Hesdin
1909 : Paris-La Flèche
1910 : French road champion
1910 : Bordeaux–Paris
1911 : Circuit de Touraine
1911 : Paris–Brest–Paris
1912 : Bordeaux–Paris

Other Results 
 2nd place in the 1909 Milan–San Remo race.
 3rd place at Paris–Tours 1907, Bordeaux–Paris 1908 and Paris–Tours 1911.
 Winner of the Six-Days of Toulouse 1906 with his brother Léon.

References

External links 
 L'Equipe rider profile

1881 births
1960 deaths
Sportspeople from Indre-et-Loire
French male cyclists
French Tour de France stage winners
Cyclists from Centre-Val de Loire